Kahurtak (also Romanized as Kahūrtak) is a village in Cheraghabad Rural District, Tukahur District, Minab County, Hormozgan Province, Iran. At the 2006 census, its population was 435, in 91 families.

References 

Populated places in Minab County